Georg Klein (born 1953 in Augsburg) is a German novelist. His wife  is also a writer. In September 2012 he was keynote speaker at the British Council sponsored Edinburgh World Writers' Conference in Berlin. Having worked for many years as a ghost-writer Klein was discovered in 2001 with his detective story Barbar Rosa.

Awards 

 1999: Brothers Grimm Prize of the City of Hanau
 2000: Ingeborg Bachmann Prize
 2010: Leipzig Book Fair Prize for Fiction
 2012: Lower Saxony State Prize
 2022: Großer Preis des Deutschen Literaturfonds

Works 
 Libidissi. novel. Fest, Berlin 1998. 
 Anrufung des blinden Fisches. short stories. Fest, Berlin 1999. 
 Barbar Rosa. Eine Detektivgeschichte. Fest, Berlin 2001. 
 Von den Deutschen. short stories. Rowohlt, Reinbek bei Hamburg 2002. 
 Die Sonne scheint uns. novel. Rowohlt, Reinbek bei Hamburg 2004. 
 Sünde Güte Blitz. novel. Rowohlt, Reinbek bei Hamburg 2007. 
 Schlimme schlimme Medien. 2-CD-Set. supposé, Köln 2007. 
 Nacht mit dem Schandwerker. In:  pp. 238–258
 Roman unserer Kindheit. novel. Rowohlt, Reinbek bei Hamburg 2010. 
 Die Logik der Süße. short stories. Rowohlt, Reinbek bei Hamburg 2010. 
 Schund & Segen  77 Abverlangte Texte. Rowohlt, Reinbek bei Hamburg 2013, 
 Die Zukunft des Mars. novel. Rowohlt, Reinbek bei Hamburg 2013, 
 Miakro. novel. Rowohlt, Reinbek bei Hamburg 2018,

References

Further reading

External links 

 Bachmannpreis 2000
 Georg Klein im Augsburg-Wiki (German)

1953 births

Living people
Articles containing video clips
German male writers